The 1939 Scranton Tomcats football team was an American football team that represented the University of Scranton during the 1939 college football season. The team compiled a 7–0–2 record, shut out five of nine opponents, and outscored all opponents by a total of 159 to 40. The team played its home games at Athletic Park in Scranton, Pennsylvania.

Tom Davies was the team's head coach for three years from 1937 to 1939. He left Scranton in March 1940 with a record of 20–3. He was inducted into the College Football Hall of Fame in 1970.

Schedule

References

Scranton
Scranton Royals football seasons
College football undefeated seasons
Scranton Tomcats football